Sharmaine Ruffa Rama Gutierrez (born June 24, 1974) is a Filipino model, beauty queen, host and actress. She was the 1992 Look of the Year - Philippines, Binibining Pilipinas World 1993 and Second Runner-up to Miss World 1993.

Career
Gutierrez began acting as a teenager in the 1980s, under BMG Films. She became part of German Moreno's That's Entertainment variety show in the early 1990s before becoming a beauty queen in 1993. In December 1990, Gutierrez replaced Snooky Serna for the lead role in Regal Film's Wunder Wuman Plus One, paired with comedian Rene Requiestas. However, the project did not come to fruition, with Gutierrez and Requiestas instead paired in the 1993 film Hulihin: Probinsyanong Mandurukot.

As the official representative of her country to the 1993 Miss World pageant held in Sun City, South Africa, on November 27, Gutierrez placed Second Runner-up to winner Lisa Hanna of Jamaica.

In 1993, Gutierrez was linked to the Brunei beauties affair.

In the late 1980s and 1990s she did multiple films each year from 1987 to 1998 with Regal Films. She ventured into TV again as a replacement and regular TV host on The Buzz, a Sunday TV talk show, and then in 2010 with Paparazzi on rival station TV5.

Personal life
She is the only daughter of actor, Eddie Gutierrez and talent manager, Annabelle Rama. She has two half-brothers, Tonton Gutierrez and Ramon Christopher, from her father's previous relationships. She has five brothers: Elvis Gutierrez, Rocky Gutierrez, Ritchie Paul Gutierrez and Raymond Gutierrez and Richard Gutierrez.

In 2003, she married Yilmaz Bektas, Turkish businessman. They had two children, Lorin Gabriella and Venezia Loran. They announced their separation through a joint statement on May 8, 2007.

Filmography

Television

Film

Online series

References

External links
Ruffa Gutierrez's Official Website

Filipino Model official website

1974 births
Living people
Actresses from Manila
Binibining Pilipinas winners
Filipino child actresses
Filipino female models
Filipino film actresses
Filipino people of Canadian descent
Filipino people of Spanish descent
Filipino television actresses
Filipino television talk show hosts
Miss World 1993 delegates
Ruffa
That's Entertainment (Philippine TV series)
GMA Network personalities
ABS-CBN personalities
Star Circle Quest
TV5 (Philippine TV network) personalities
That's Entertainment Monday Group Members
Viva Artists Agency
Filipino women comedians